David Strudwick (11 January 1934 – 20 December 2014) was an Australian cricketer. He played one first-class match for South Australia in 1957/58.

See also
 List of South Australian representative cricketers

References

External links
 

1934 births
2014 deaths
Australian cricketers
South Australia cricketers
Cricketers from Adelaide